Strange Reign is the nineteenth studio album by American rapper Tech N9ne, the eighth in his "Collabos" series. The album was released on October 13, 2017, by Strange Music. It features the entire Strange Music roster and it was solely produced by the label's in-house producer Seven, with the exception of "Dangerous" and "These Hands" being co-produced with Sainte and Joshua S. Barber respectively along with "'Brand New Hunnids" being produced by Frizz.

Track listing
 All tracks produced solely by Seven, except "Brand New Hunnids" was produced by Frizz, while "Dangerous" was co-produced with Sainte, and "These Hands" was co-produced with Joshua S. Barber.

References

2017 albums
Tech N9ne albums
Strange Music albums